Ahola is a Finnish surname. Notable people with the surname include:

 Jarkko Ahola (born 1977), Finnish heavy metal artist
 Jouko Ahola (born 1970), Finnish strongman, powerlifter and actor
 Mika Ahola (1974–2012), Finnish enduro rider and a five-time world champion
 Peter Ahola (born 1968), Finnish ice hockey player
 Sylvester Ahola (1902–1995), American jazz trumpeter
 Terry Ahola, American skier

See also
 Ahöla, a spirit being in Hopi religion

Finnish-language surnames